El Cantante is a studio album by Andrés Calamaro. Initially it was going to include only covers from Latinoamerican artists but in the end three new songs recorded by Calamaro were added. The album and title track name comes from the song 'El Cantante', originally composed by Rubén Blades and performed by Héctor Lavoe.

Track listing
Malena (Lucio Demare, Homero Manzi) - 2:28
Volver (Carlos Gardel, Alfredo Lepera) - 3:12
La Distancia (Roberto Carlos) - 3:56
Estadio Azteca (Andrés Calamaro, Marcelo Scornik) - 3:40
Sus Ojos Se Cerraron (Carlos Gardel, Alfredo Lepera) - 3:52
Algo Contigo (Chico Novarro) - 3:20
El Arriero (Atahualpa Yupanqui) - 2:40
La Libertad (Andrés Calamaro, Gringui Herrera) - 3:15
Alfonsina y el mar / Zamba de mi esperanza (Félix Luna, Ariel Ramírez) - 4:53
Las Oportunidades (Andrés Calamaro) - 3:05
Voy a Perder la Cabeza por tu Amor (Manuel Alejandro, Ana Magdalena) - 4:46
El Cantante (Rubén Blades) - 4:38

References

Andrés Calamaro albums
2004 albums